Tehaleh, formerly known as Cascadia, is a master-planned unincorporated community to the south of Bonney Lake in Pierce County, Washington, United States. Construction began in 2005 with an estimated timeline for completion of 20 years. The town was designed by  Patrick Kuo, who had purchased the land in 1991. Included in the original plan for Cascadia were 6,500 homes, a commercial district, an industrial park, schools, and recreational parkland for residents to enjoy. Construction halted in 2008, prior to the construction of any homes or commercial properties. After foreclosure proceedings in 2010, Homestreet Bank repossessed much of Kuo's land, intending to find another developer.

History

Financial crisis

In October 2009, Cascadia Project LLC, the company behind the planning of Cascadia, filed for Chapter 11 bankruptcy protection. According to HomeStreet Bank, which financed the project, over 72 million dollars of loans were non-performing. HomeStreet Bank had planned to foreclose and auction off the land of the community, which had been running behind schedule with only a school and some road-related infrastructure completed.  The bankruptcy restructuring plan proposed by Cascadia Project LLC was rejected by the U.S. Bankruptcy Court, and HomeStreet Bank completed foreclosure of the land and held an auction September 24, 2010.  As there were no qualified bidders, the property reverted to HomeStreet Bank ownership.  Following the auction HomeStreet Bank intended to find another developer for the community.

Recovery as Tehaleh

Newland Communities and North American Sekisui House salvaged the project in 2011 by purchasing 4,200 of the original 5,000 acres of land for 49 million dollars. The development was renamed Tehaleh, derived from Chinook jargon meaning “highlands” or “the land above”. The revised plan calls for constructing 5,900 houses and 4 million square feet of business property within the next 25 years. The plan also retains the many parks and trails included in the failed Cascadia project. On 26 September 2012, Tehaleh opened its first ten model houses.

Due to its elevated geography on a plateau, several hundred feet above the adjacent Puyallup River valley, Tehaleh is not at risk of flooding from the Puyallup River unlike many communities in close proximity to Mount Rainier. In the event of an eruption of Mount Rainier, Tehaleh is not within the USGS delineated mudslides hazard zone. Because of its elevation and location outside of the lahar inundation zone, a project has been proposed to construct a bridge from Orting to Tehaleh, called Bridge for Kids, to provide Orting residents an additional evacuation route to the high ground on Tehaleh, in case of emergency.

Education 
Tehaleh currently has two public elementary schools, Donald Eismann Elementary and Tehaleh Heights Elementary, both are operated by Sumner-Bonney Lake School District.,

Mountain View Middle School, located 3.2 miles north of Tehaleh, serves as the middle school for residents of Tehaleh. Across the street from the middle school, Bonney Lake High School serves as the high school residents of Tehaleh. Both the middle and the high schools are operated by Sumner-Bonney Lake School District.

Infrastructure

Transportation

Public Transportation 
There is no direct public transportation service to Tehaleh. The closest bus stop is the Bonney Lake Park-and-Ride, located roughly 5 miles north. Residents who commute to Seattle usually take the bus from the Bonney Lake Park-and-Ride to the Sumner Station where they board Sound Transit's Sounder train service to Seattle.

Restaurants

The Mantel 
The Mantel, is a private dining establishment set within Seven Summits Lodge in the Trilogy, a 55+ community within Tehaleh. The Mantel is a members-only establishment that is not open to the general public. A limited number of annual dining memberships are made available each year.

Caffe D'arte at Tehaleh 
The cafe is located within The Post, Tehaleh's community center.

The Post 
The Post is the main (and currently the only) community and information center in Tehaleh. The office within The Post is staffed by Newland Communities. Residents and visitors stop by to relax or get information about the community.

The Post also offers two outdoor seating areas, front and back of the building. The front outdoor seating area offers scenic views of the Mount Rainier.

Parks and Trails 
Tehaleh master plan includes 1,800 acres of trails, parks and open space. Currently, there are 12 parks and more than 10 miles of trails with several more parks and trails in the future plan.

References

Unincorporated communities in Pierce County, Washington
Unincorporated communities in Washington (state)
Planned communities in Washington (state)